United Nations Security Council Resolution 1840 was unanimously adopted on 14 October 2008.

Resolution 
The Security Council decided this morning to extend the mandate of the United Nations Stabilization Mission in Haiti (MINUSTAH) until 15 October 2009, with the intention of further renewal.

Unanimously adopting resolution 1840 (2008) under Chapter VII of the United Nations Charter, the Council endorsed the Secretary-General’s recommendation to maintain the Mission’s current configuration until the planned substantial increase of the Haitian National Police capacity, therefore deciding that MINUSTAH would continue to consist of a military component of up to 7,060 troops and a total police component of 2,091.

The Council called upon MINUSTAH to support the political process under way and, in cooperation with the Government, to promote an all-inclusive political dialogue and national reconciliation, and to provide logistical and security assistance for the upcoming elections.  It also called upon the Mission to expand its support to strengthen self-sustaining State institutions, especially outside Port-au-Prince, the capital.

By other terms of the text, the Council requested that MINUSTAH continue its support of the Haitian National Police and remain engaged in helping the Government reform and restructure the force.  It invited Member States, including neighbouring and regional countries, to engage with the Government in addressing cross-border illicit trafficking of persons, drugs, arms and other illegal activities, and to contribute to strengthening the capacity of the Haiti National Police in those areas.

Also by the text, the Council requested the United Nations country team, and called upon all actors, to complement security and development operations with activities aimed at effectively improving the living conditions of the concerned populations.  It also requested MINUSTAH to continue to implement quick-impact projects.

The Council further requested MINUSTAH to continue to pursue its community violence reduction approach, including by supporting the National Commission on Disarmament, Dismantlement and Reintegration and concentrating its efforts on labour-intensive projects, development of a weapons registry, revision of laws on the importation and possession of arms, reform of the weapons permit system and the promotion of a national community policing doctrine.

See also 
List of United Nations Security Council Resolutions 1801 to 1900 (2008–2009)

References

External links
 
Text of the Resolution at undocs.org

 1840
 1840
October 2008 events
2008 in Haiti